Charles de Gontaut, duc de Biron (156231 July 1602) was a French soldier whose military achievements were accompanied by plotting to dismember France and setting himself up as ruler of an independent Burgundy.

Biography
He was born in Saint-Blancard. He was the son of Armand de Gontaut, baron de Biron, under whose command he fought for the royal party against the Catholic League in the later stages of the Wars of Religion in France. His efforts won him the name "Thunderbolt of France". Henry IV made him Admiral of France in 1592, and Marshal of France in 1594. As governor of Burgundy, in 1595 he took the towns of Beaune, Autun, Auxonne and Dijon, and distinguished himself at the Battle of Fontaine-Française. In 1596, he was sent to fight the Spaniards in Flanders, Picardy, Artois and finally at the Siege of Amiens where he funded much of the King's army.

After the Peace of Vervins, he undertook a mission at Brussels in 1598. From that time, he was engaged in intrigues with Spain and Savoy aiming at the overthrow of the Bourbon dynasty, the dismemberment of the kingdom of France into provincial states, and his own elevation as sovereign of Burgundy. Notwithstanding these intrigues, he directed the expedition sent against Charles Emmanuel I, Duke of Savoy (1599–1600). He fulfilled diplomatic missions for Henry in Switzerland (1600) and England (1601), the latter to announce the marriage of Henry to Maria de' Medici.

While engaged in these duties, he was accused and convicted in his absence of high treason by the French Parlement. He was induced to come to Paris, where he was apprehended and then beheaded in the Bastille on 31 July 1602.

In literature and pop culture
He was the inspiration behind the character Berowne in William Shakespeare's Love's Labour's Lost, which was written during his lifetime. After his death, his tragic fate was dramatised by George Chapman in The Conspiracy and Tragedy of Charles, Duke of Byron (1608, republished in 1625 and 1653).

Biron was also the subject of the song La Complainte Du Maréchal Biron by the Canadian folk rock group Garolou. The lyrics to the song change the story significantly, having him accused of treason for having an affair with the Queen. He begs the King for his life, reminding him that he saved his life three times. But the King is unmoved by his plea.

Notes

References
 

Biron, Charles de Gontaut, duc de
Biron, Charles de Gontaut, duc de
People from Gers
Charles de Gontaut, duc de
Charles
Biron, Charles de Gontaut, duc de
Biron, Charles de Gontaut, duc de
Biron, Charles de Gontaut, duc de
Biron, Charles de Gontaut, duc de
Biron, Charles de Gontaut, duc de
17th-century executions by France
Biron
Executed people from Midi-Pyrénées
Prisoners of the Bastille
Peers created by Henry IV of France
16th-century peers of France
17th-century peers of France